The 42nd World Cup season began in October 2007 in Sölden, Austria and concluded on 15 March 2008, at the World Cup Finals in Bormio, Italy.  (The team event scheduled for the following day was canceled, due to adverse weather conditions.)

The overall champions were Bode Miller and Lindsey Vonn, both of the United States.  It was Miller's second overall title and Vonn's first, and the first for an American woman in a quarter century. The last was Tamara McKinney in 1983, which was also the last U.S. sweep as Phil Mahre won his third consecutive overall title.

Miller won the 2008 title by a margin of 111 points over runner-up Benjamin Raich of Austria, while Vonn outpaced her closest rival, Austrian Nicole Hosp, by 220 points.  Austria won the Nations Cup for the 20th consecutive season, scoring more than double the points of runner-up Switzerland.

Calendar

Men

Ladies

Nations team event

Men's standings

Overall

Downhill

Super G

Giant slalom

Slalom

Super combined

Ladies' standings

Overall

Downhill

Super G

Giant slalom

Slalom

Super combined

Nations Cup

Overall

Men

Ladies

Footnotes

References

External links
 FIS-ski.com – World Cup standings – 2008

FIS Alpine Ski World Cup
World Cup
World Cup